Canardo may refer to:

Canardo (rapper), French rapper of Moroccan origin
Mariano Cañardo (1906–1987), Spanish professional road racing cyclist
Inspector Canardo, comic book series created by the Belgian artist Benoît Sokal

See also
Canard (disambiguation)